Events in the year 1938 in Bulgaria.

Incumbents 
Monarch – Boris III

Events 

 6 – 27 March – Parliamentary elections were held in Bulgaria.

References 

 
1930s in Bulgaria
Years of the 20th century in Bulgaria
Bulgaria
Bulgaria